The Star Watch Case Company was a manufacturing firm in Ludington, Michigan, from around 1903–05 until it went out of business in 1982. The company designed and manufactured watch cases for Hamilton, Longines, Gruen, and Elgin watch companies among others who shipped their internal watch mechanisms to Star which would complete final assembly.

The company began making cases for pocket watches, adding wristwatches later. Star also manufactured small mechanical parts for military equipment during World War II. The etching designs were done on engineered machines made at the company specifically manufactured for the purpose. Astronaut Eugene A. Cernan wore the Omega Speedmaster Professional watch on a mission to the moon; commonly referred to as the "Moonwatch", the Star Watch Case Company had made cases for it. The demise of the company started when Elgin Watch Company decided to acquire several other vendors for their watch cases.

History 

The immediate predecessor of the Star Watch Case Company was the Illinois Watch Case Company in Elgin, Illinois, that was founded in 1898. by Otto A. Starke, Fred Hermann, and Alfred W. Church. Starke and Hermann were foremen at Illinois Watch before starting in business for themselves. Starke had the specialty of being an engraver and steel hub cutter, while Hermann specialized in the mechanics of the tools and machines for making watch cases. In 1902 or 1903 a large fire destroyed the Illinois manufacturing facility. The company was well insured, and it was able to recover. There were 27 employees in the business before the fire.

The company changed its name sometime between 1903 and 1905 to the Star Watch Case Company and incorporated on February 7, 1905. Officers of the new Star Watch Case Company were Otto A. Starke, president; Fred Hermann, vice president; Warren Antoine Cartier, secretary; and Alfred W. Church, treasurer. In 1906 in Ludington, the company's key hand engrave was Fritz Baumgartner, assisted by hand engravers Emil Allemann and Otto Starke. Later in 1905 the company moved to Ludington, Michigan. By 1913 it had about 150 employees, which grew to 400 by 1925. The company's (sometimes referred to as Star Watchcase Company) employment reached its peak during World War II at 550 employees. 

The primary factory building was built on South Rath Avenue in 1905, and later expanded in 1910. North and south wings were added to the main building in 1920. In 1927, the company added still another enlargement wing for tool, die equipment and machinery. The addition was one hundred feet long by thirty feet in width and was three stories high.

Products

The Star Watch Case Company designed, manufactured and assembled watch cases for a plethora of watchmakers. The movements (mechanisms), dials, hands, crystals (glass watch faces), and some of the crowns (buttons used to wind the watch) were made by other vendors and shipped to Star for final assembly. Star's watchmaker clients included Manistee Watch Company, Hamilton, Longines, Elgin, Gruen, Omega and Pulsar. 

Until World War I the company manufactured pocket watch cases exclusively. They were available in solid gold, gold filled, sterling silver, rolled nickel-silver or brass. Styles included open face and hunting cases. After the war, wristwatch cases were added to the product line.

Government procurement
The company produced thousands of watches during World War I that could easily be seen without removing them from pockets. Pocket watch cases were Star's major product until the United States entered the World War II. Then the factory was converted to making brass compass cases, small weapons components, and submarine parts. During the war, the company's reputation for making quality stainless steel military watch cases and cases for military compasses grew. Additionally, the company manufactured elements of military navigational aids. It also made components  for the top secret Norden bombsight, used for accurate airborne bombing.

Star Watch Case Company made cases for the Omega Speedmaster Professional, worn by Eugene A. Cernan on a trip to the moon, commonly referred to as the "Moonwatch." Other similar Star models were worn on various space missions. Edward H. White wore a Speedmaster during his Gemini 4 spacewalk. Ed Mitchell wore a Speedmaster on Apollo 14. Neil Armstrong wore a Speedmaster on Apollo 11.

Design

A Star employee, Andrew Hallberg, developed a proprietary pantograph which increased production speed by allowing up to 32 watch backs to be engraved simultaneously, making it much more efficient than hand engraving. The cutting-edge, mass-production technology was closely guarded from competitors, giving the company an advantage in accelerated watch case production. It is a device that can copy and scale, in the instance of Star Watch Case, various engravings on the reverse side of a watch case using the mathematical properties of parallelograms. An actual pantograph used by the company is on display at the Time Museum in White Pine Village in Ludington.  The machine was so successful that by 1930 hand engraving of pocket watches became obsolete.

The company performed all phases of manufacture of a watch case at their Ludington facilities, except the making of watch crystals. The raw material for the watch cases consisted of flat stock, wire and seamless tubing made from a fine gold, which was an alloy formulated by the company. The parts were blanked out, formed and pressed, machined to size, assembled, drilled, turned and reamed to fit the movement that was going to be used in it. Next the cases were polished, plated, fitted with crystals, inspected and the final produced product shipped for merchandising. Up to 150 different operations could be performed on a watch case, with precision as close as a thousandth of an inch on average. The finished product was free of any scratch, blemish, stain or finger mark. This close tolerance work required a number of precise and accurate tools, dies, and fixtures — which were all made at the company facilities.

The company made gold, silver, nickel, brass, zinc and chrome-plated cases with solid gold and gold-filled based cases most popular. Ludington State Bank in downtown Ludington held their gold supply (in bars), then the bars were transferred to the factory as needed for melting and manufacturing. The factory in the 1920s held around $200,000 worth of gold at any one time for watch cases of 10, 14, or 18 karats.

Following are the model case names and metals used:
 The Star gold-filled case was guaranteed for 20 years as late as November 1906 and 25 years by April 1909.
 The Defiance gold-filled case was guaranteed for 10 years.
 The Majestic gold-filled case was guaranteed for 5 years.
 The Stellar had a 10 karat rolled gold plate case.
 The Scepter was a gold-filled or rolled gold plate case.
 The Excellence was a silver case.

The company's trade mark was a five-pointed star and the double-headed eagle. Additional Star trade marks are below:

Demise

The American watch industry was the first in the world to mechanize production on a large scale which forced the dominant Swiss watch industry to mechanize. The first watches were large but as machines were developed they became smaller in size and less expensive because of mechanical mass-production. The American watch industry held their position until World War I when wristwatches came into vogue and Switzerland started producing them. By 1961, Switzerland lead the world in wristwatch production of 15,000,000 watches per year, Russia produced about 20,000,000 watches annually, and France, Germany and Japan each produced about 12,000,000 wristwatches per year. The United Slates produced only about 5,000,000 watches per year. One reason for this difference is that other countries had better technology than the United States by that time. Another reason is that other countries had lower labor rates than the United States, with Switzerland's rate at about one-fourth and Japan's rate at about one-twelfth compared to the United States. 

In the 1960s, the Elgin Watch Company decided that a single vendor should not supply more than a third of its needs. Star Watch Case Company was removed from Elgin's supplier list. Two decades later the company was all but out of business. In 1979, it was sold to Société Suisse pour l'Industrie Horlogère. By 1982, the Star Watch Case Company was defunct. All of the company's furnishings and machinery were then sold and the building was demolished in 1995.

Gallery

See also 

Manistee Watch Company

Footnotes

Sources

Further reading
 Defunct watchmaking companies
Manufacturing companies established in 1905
Manufacturing companies disestablished in 1982
1905 establishments in Michigan
1982 disestablishments in Michigan
Defunct manufacturing companies based in Michigan